999 (nine hundred ninety-nine or nine-nine-nine) is a natural number following 998 and preceding 1000.

In mathematics
 , a Kaprekar number.
 a repdigit in decimal and hexatridecimal.
 a palindromic number in bases 10, 14 (51514), and 36 (RR36).
 the largest 3-digit decimal integer.
 the largest number in English not containing the letter 'o' in its name, when using short scale.
 A base-10 Harshad number because , a whole number

Other fields
 In some parts of the world, such as the UK and Commonwealth countries, 999 (pronounced as 9-9-9) is the emergency telephone number. 
 999 was a London punk band active during the 1970s.
 999 is also the short name for the visual novel Nine Hours, Nine Persons, Nine Doors.
 999 is the last 3 digit number.

References

Integers